People‘s Education Society (PES) was founded in 1972 with just over 40 students in a rented gymnasium in Bangalore, Karnataka. Today, PES has more than 18,000 students spread across multiple campuses in Karnataka and Andhra Pradesh.

History
People‘s Education Society (PES) was established under Mysore Societies Registration Act 1960 (Mysore Act No. 17 of 1960) on October 11, 1972, and was founded by Dr. M. R. Doreswamy.

Mission Statement

Mission
To provide students with a sense of history, an understanding of values and ethics, a commitment to law and morality, an appreciation of human creativity and an analytical inquiring mind.

Vision
To create professionally superior and ethically strong global workforce.

Quality Policy
To develop highly skilled human resources with the ability to adapt to an intellectually and technologically changing environment with the participative efforts of the management, staff, students and parents.

Educational institutions
PES is currently running the following educational institutions.

References

Educational institutions in India
1972 establishments in India
Educational institutions established in 1972